Jake Gervase (born September 18, 1995) is an American football linebacker who is a free agent. He played college football at Iowa.

College career
Gervase was a member of the Iowa Hawkeyes for five seasons, joining the team as a walk-on and redshirting his true freshman season. As a redshirt senior, he led the Hawkeyes with 89 tackles, seven passes broken up, and four interceptions and was named honorable mention All-Big Ten Conference. Gervase finished his collegiate career with 153 total tackles and seven interceptions in 44 games played.

Professional career

Gervase signed with the Los Angeles Rams as an undrafted free agent on May 14, 2019. Gervase was waived on August 31, 2019, as part of final roster cuts, but was re-signed to the Rams' practice squad the following day. Gervase was promoted to the Rams active roster on October 19, 2019. He made his NFL debut the following day in a 37–10 against the Atlanta Falcons, playing one snap on defense and 13 on special teams.

On July 25, 2020, Gervase was waived by the Rams. He re-signed with the Rams on August 14, 2020. He was waived on September 4, 2020. He was re-signed to their practice squad on November 3, 2020. He was placed on the practice squad/COVID-19 list by the team on November 18, and restored to the practice squad on November 28. He was elevated to the active roster on December 19 for the team's week 15 game against the New York Jets, and reverted to the practice squad after the game. On January 25, 2021, Gervase signed a reserve/futures contract with the Rams. Gervase made a transition to inside linebacker for the 2021 season.

On August 31, 2021, Gervase was waived by the Rams. He was re-signed to their practice squad on September 24, 2021. He was signed to the active roster on January 12, 2022. Gervase played in two games on special teams and recorded two tackles during the regular season and also played in all four of the Rams' postseason games, including the team's 23–20 win over the Cincinnati Bengals in Super Bowl LVI. 

On May 23, 2022, Gervase re-signed with the Rams. He was placed on injured reserve on December 24, 2022.

References

External links
Iowa Hawkeyes bio
Los Angeles Rams bio

1995 births
Living people
Players of American football from Iowa
Sportspeople from Davenport, Iowa
American football safeties
Iowa Hawkeyes football players
Los Angeles Rams players